Ken Schwaber (born 1945 in Wheaton, Illinois) is a software developer, product manager and industry consultant.  He worked with Jeff Sutherland to formulate the initial versions of the Scrum framework and to present Scrum as a formal process at OOPSLA'95. Schwaber and Sutherland are two of the 17 initial signatories of the Agile Manifesto. They are co-authors of the Scrum Guide. Schwaber runs Scrum.org, which provides Scrum resources, training, assessments, and certifications for Scrum Masters, Scrum Developers, Scrum Product Owners, and organizations using Scrum.

Schwaber is one of the leaders of the agile software development movement. He is a founder of the Agile Alliance, and he is responsible for founding the Scrum Alliance and creating the Certified Scrum Master programs and its derivatives. He resigned from the Scrum Alliance in 2009 after a disagreement with the board regarding assessments, certification, and a developer program. He subsequently founded Scrum.org. At Scrum.org, he led the development of new courseware, assessments, and partnerships to improve the quality and effectiveness of Scrum. He has  published and updated Scrum with Jeff Sutherland, and wrote "Software in Thirty Days" also with Sutherland.

Works

References

External links

 Ken Schwaber's Blog: Telling It Like It Is
 Scrum.org

American computer scientists
Extreme programming
Agile software development
American technology writers
American computer programmers
Living people
1945 births